Keen City is a creative production company based in London. Named from a line in the poem "The Moon's a Balloon" by E. E. Cummings, Keen City are a team of writers, directors and producers who make performance driven narrative content.

Founded in 2008, their first film, Alleyman, won a British Lion Award for Achievement at the British Independent Film Awards, 2011 Keen City was behind Forget Me Not.

Short films
Alleyman (2011) IMDb Directed by Andrew Ellinas. 
Darkest Before Dawn (2011) Directed by Leah Stipic.
The Tyrant's Cup (2012) IMDb, Directed by Nick Goulden.
Child, (2012) Directed by George Watson.
Lonesome, (2012) Directed by Francis Wallis.
12, (2014) Directed by George Watson.
Lucky Bastards, (2015) Directed by Andrew Ellinas.
Reality Mine, (2015) Directed by Nick Goulden.
Forget Me Not, (2019) Directed by Nick Goulden

Selected Awards and nominations 

 Winner: Best Drama - Portobello Film Festival
 Winner: Best Drama - Dam Short Film Festival
 Winner: Best Short - Zero Plus Film Festival
 Winner: Special Award - Zero Plus Film Festival
 Longlisted: - Best British Short Film - BAFTA
 Finalist: Light in Motion Award for Best Drama - Foyle Film Festival
 Finalist: Best British Short Film - British British Independent Film Festival
 Nominated: Best Short Film - Norwich Film Festival
 Nominated: Best British Short Film, Best Lead Actor - James Cosmo, Best Supporting Actress - Ruby Royle, Best Production Design - Southampton Film Festival
 Finalist: Best Director, Best Composer - L.I.M.P.A London Film Festival
 Nominated: Best Film - Alicante Film Festival
 Nominated: Best Film - New Haven Film Festival
 Nominated: Best Film - Madrid Independent Film Festival
 Nominated: Best Film - Cinemagic Film Festival
 Nominated: Best Fiction Short Film - Picknic Film Festival
 Nominated: Best Film - Ciudad De La Linea Film Festival
 Winner: British Lion Award - British Independent Film Festival
 Honourable Mention - Los Angeles Film Festival

References

External links

Film production companies of the United Kingdom